The 1919 Utah Agricultural Aggies football team was an American football team that represented Utah Agricultural College (later renamed Utah State University) in the Rocky Mountain Conference (RMC) during the 1919 college football season. In their first season under head coach Dick Romney, the Aggies compiled a 5–2 record (3–2 against RMC opponents), placed fourth in the conference, and outscored all opponents by a total of 234 to 44.

Schedule

References

Utah Agricultural
Utah State Aggies football seasons
Utah State Aggies football